Conduit  may refer to:

Engineering systems 
 Conduit (fluid conveyance), a pipe suitable for carrying either open-channel or pressurized liquids
 Electrical conduit, a protective cover, tube or piping system for electric cables
 Conduit current collection, a system of ground-level power supply
 Duct (flow), for heating, ventilating and air-conditioning

Business 
 Conduit (finance) or asset-backed commercial paper program, a type of non-bank financial institution
 Conduit and Sink OFCs, a classification of offshore financial centres/tax havens

Computers and Internet 
 Conduit (company), an international software company
 Conduit toolbar a defunct web publishing platform by Conduit
 Conduit (software), an open-source synchronization program for GNOME

Arts and entertainment 
 Conduit (Coby Sey album), by Coby Sey, 2022
 Conduit (Funeral for a Friend album), by Funeral for a Friend, 2013
 The Conduit (album), by Jarboe, 2005
 Conduit (comics), a DC Comics supervillain
 Conduit (convention), an annual science fiction convention in Salt Lake City, Utah, US
 Conduit (mural), a public artwork by Emily Ginsburg in Portland, Oregon, US
 "Conduit" (The X-Files), a television episode
 The Conduit, a 2009 video game for the Wii console
 The Conduit, a fictional artifact in the video game Mass Effect
 Conduits, superhuman beings in the video game series Infamous

Other uses 
 Conduit (channeling), a means of contact with the spiritual realm
 Conduit (horse) (2005–2020), a Thoroughbred racehorse
 Conduit Road, a road in Hong Kong

See also 
 Channel (geography), a type of landform
 Gap junction, an intercellular conduit in molecular cell biology
 Membrane nanotube, another type of intercellular conduit
 Conveyance (disambiguation)